Gosbert Begumisa Blandes (born 18 February 1963) is a Tanzanian CCM politician and Member of Parliament for Karagwe constituency since 2005.

References

1963 births
Living people
Chama Cha Mapinduzi MPs
Tanzanian MPs 2005–2010
Tanzanian MPs 2010–2015
University of Dar es Salaam alumni